Stratford-upon-Avon railway station is the southern terminus of the North Warwickshire Line and Leamington-Stratford line, serving the town of Stratford-upon-Avon in Warwickshire, England. The station is served by West Midlands Trains (WMT) and Chiltern Railways.

Prior to August 1976, the station provided direct links to the south of the region via the Cotswold Line; however, the derailment of a freight train prompted British Rail to withdraw the link.

History
This was soon followed by the Stratford on Avon Railway branch from Hatton to the north, which opened on 9 October 1860, with a station on Birmingham Road. Both branches were initially unconnected, with separate termini, but an agreement was soon made to join the branches, with a single station at the present site, which opened on 24 July 1861, on this date the former Stratford on Avon Railway terminus on Birmingham Road became a goods station. Both branches later came under the control of Great Western Railway (GWR). 

In 1908, Great Western Railway opened the North Warwickshire Line which incorporated parts of the two original branch lines into a new main line from Birmingham to Cheltenham. This placed Stratford-upon-Avon on the main line, which prompted the expansion of the station with a third platform being added.

Through services to Gloucester were withdrawn in 1968, and passenger services south of Stratford-upon-Avon ceased altogether on 5 May 1969. The line remained open to freight traffic until a derailment prompted British Rail to close the line entirely in 1976. Consequently, Stratford-upon-Avon became the southern terminus of the line from Birmingham and Hatton.

Between 1873 and 1952, Stratford-upon-Avon was also served by Stratford Old Town railway station on the Stratford-upon-Avon and Midland Junction Railway (SMJR).

A new parkway station was opened to the north of the town next to the A46 road on 19 May 2013. It was proposed that building the station would ease congestion, as passengers from outside the area were no longer required to drive into the town to access rail transport. In addition, services between Birmingham and Stratford-upon-Avon were increased from hourly to half-hourly in conjunction with the opening of the station.

On 26 November 2015, a second footbridge and lifts were built, which gave people with limited mobility the ability to use all of the platforms. It was also announced that a new café, waiting room and retail area were being planned. On 18 March 2019, a refurbishment of the station was started, which was funded by the Department for Transport and Warwickshire County Council. The refurbishment consisted of rebuilding the ticket hall, improving the seating areas, upgrading the toilet facilities and implementing bike racks.

Facilities
The station has a ticket office located next to the station entrance on platform one which can usually be accessed on each day of the week with varying opening hours. Tickets can be also be purchased from the self-service machine outside the ticket office which accepts card payments. If a person wishes to pay by cash or voucher when the ticket office is closed, they are advised to do so by asking a senior conductor or train manager.

Step-free access is available between the platforms by using the lifts on the footbridge. Station staff are able to provide assistance whilst the ticket office is open. Outside of these hours, information is available from the help points located on both platforms. Cycle parking is also available.

Services

West Midlands Railway 

There are two routes between Birmingham and Stratford; one service per hour runs via , and the other via . Later in the day, the frequency of services is reduced to once-hourly with trains only running via .

Chiltern Railways 
Chiltern Railways provide a single service approximately every two hours to  via  along the Leamington-Stratford line.

On Sunday, the frequency of services remains the same; however, they are only available from late morning to late evening.

Vintage Trains 

Stratford-Honeybourne line
The scheme (supported as a freight diversionary route by DB Schenker) would make Stratford a through station once again, with improved connections to the south of the region. It would open up the possibility of direct services towards London Paddington, via Oxford, and also significantly faster services to Worcester, via .

The scheme has been deemed economically beneficial in the long-term, being supported by former Prime Minister David Cameron and Network Rail. It has also been overwhelmingly supported by the local community, consisting of rail users and local businesses; however, the district council have opposed the scheme due to financial costs.

In November 2020, it was announced that the scheme had been approved for up to £50,000 funding by the Department for Transport (DfT) under the second round of the Restoring your Railway Fund. However, in June 2022, it was announced that the government had rejected the case to reopen the line.

Criticism 
The station has often been criticised for having slow and infrequent connections. Stratford-upon-Avon suffers from road congestion, which is exacerbated by poor connections in the area and below average usage of rail by visitors.

See also

 Leamington-Stratford line
 North Warwickshire Line

References

External links

History and photographs at www.warwickshirerailways.com

Railway stations in Warwickshire
DfT Category D stations
Former Great Western Railway stations
Railway stations in Great Britain opened in 1861
Railway stations served by Chiltern Railways
Railway stations served by West Midlands Trains
1861 establishments in England
Stratford-upon-Avon